The men's 110 metres hurdles at the 2010 European Athletics Championships was held at the Estadi Olímpic Lluís Companys on 29 and 30 July.

Medalists

Records

Schedule

Results

Round 1
First 3 in each heat (Q) and 4 best performers (q) advance to the Semifinals.

Heat 1

Heat 2

Heat 3

Heat 4

Summary

Semifinals

Semifinal 1

Semifinal 2

Summary

Final

References
 Round 1 Results
 Semifinal Results
 Final Results
Full results

Hurdles 110
Sprint hurdles at the European Athletics Championships